Suusamyr is a village in the southern part of the Jayyl District of Chüy Region of Kyrgyzstan. Its population was 3,468 in 2021. It is situated in the Suusamyr Valley, on the northern bank of the river Suusamyr.

References

Populated places in Chüy Region